HMS Sandfly was a schooner of the Royal Navy, built by John Cuthbert, Millers Point, New South Wales and launched on 5 December 1872. She commenced service on the Australia Station at Sydney in 1873 for anti-blackbirding operations in the South Pacific. She was paid off in 1883 and sold to Samoa.

Voyages
The Sandfly was assigned to Australia Station at Sydney till June 1873. Her maiden voyage was short tour to the South Seas islands. In October, under Lieutenant W H Nowell, she seized the brig Aurora for breaching the Imperial Labour Act, which banned the practice of blackbirding. Her second voyage in 1874 was to New Guinea to assist with surveying, but she was caught in a storm and had her rudder damaged. After receiving assistance from HMS Basilisk she returned to Sydney. Her next voyage took her to Santa Cruz where on 17 September she came under attack by a large group of islanders in canoes. After a brief but fierce skirmish a breeze came up and she was able to make good her escape. Santa Cruz islanders had attacked and massacred the crew of the Lapwing several months earlier.

The Sandfly Incident
In 1880 the Sandfly was tasked with undertaking hydrographic surveys work in the Solomon Islands and New Guinea under the command of Lieutenant James Bower, the 27-year-old son of Admiral James Paterson Bower. On 13 October 1880 the Sandfly anchored at Guadalcanal. Lieutenant Bower then took the ships whaleboat to the Nggela Islands with five sailors from the Sandfly to survey the east coast of Nggela Pile. They camped on Mandoliana Island, a small island opposite Nggela Pile. A group of four islanders from Gaeta led by Vuria who was the son of Kalekona, a big man, saw them and attacked Bower and his party.

Four of the sailors were killed in the initial attack. Bower managed to escape and hid, but was later found and killed by the islanders. The surviving sailor managed to elude the attackers and swim 16 kilometres to Honggo on Nggela Pile where he was rescued and taken to safety by another islander. When the party did not return as expected on 20 October the Sandfly began a search. On 22 October it located the surviving sailor and hearing of the attack sailed into Rita Bay, opposite Mandoliana Island, to exact reprisals on the islanders. None were found so the crew burnt several canoes that were on the beach. When they were leaving a group of islanders came out of the surrounding bush and opened fire on the sailors, killing one and wounding another. The Sandfly then returned to Sydney and reported the incident.

HMS Emerald under Captain William Henry Maxwell was dispatched to the Nggela Islands in December to locate the attackers. Being unable to do so the crew of the Emerald set fire to numerous islanders houses, cut down fruit trees and destroyed canoes in reprisal for this and other incidents. The English Government was not satisfied with the outcome and sent Commander James Bruce on HMS Cormorant, along with HMS Alert. The ships were joined in the Solomons by HMS Renard. Bruce blockaded the islands and declared war on them unless they handed over the attackers within 14 days. With this turn of events Bishop John Selwyn, who was visiting the islands intervened and persuaded Kalekona to give up the perpetrators, including his son. The four natives who accompanied Vuria were executed, but Vuria managed to escape and went into hiding. Vuria continued to be unsuccessfully hunted by the British for some years after his escape.

See also
List of massacres in the Solomon Islands

Notes

References

Bastock, John (1988), Ships on the Australia Station, Child & Associates Publishing Pty Ltd; Frenchs Forest, Australia. 

1872 ships
Ships built in New South Wales
Victorian-era naval ships of the United Kingdom